Brock Staller (born 24 March 1992) is a Canadian rugby union player who plays wing for the Seattle Seawolves in Major League Rugby (MLR). He also plays international test rugby for Canada.

Early life
Staller grew up in Surrey, Canada attending Kitsilano Secondary School and played amateur rugby with the Meraloma Rugby Club.

Rugby career
Staller has represented Vancouver in regional play, British Columbia in provincial play and currently represents Canada internationally. Staller is a graduate of the University of British Columbia men's varsity rugby program, having previously attended Douglas College on a golf scholarship in New Westminster, British Columbia. He and his UBC teammates won two consecutive Rounsefell Cups in 2016 and 2017. For two years in a row, Brock was the leading points scorer in the British Columbia Rugby Union Men's premiership.

In 2016, Staller was called-up by Francois Ratier to represent the Canadian men's national team during the Americas Rugby Championship. He earned his first cap in a win against Brazil, started in the non-capped loss to Argentina XV, and closed out the tournament with a start at fullback defeating Chile.

On 3 November 2017 it was announced that Staller would be joining the Seattle Seawolves for their inaugural season in Major League Rugby.

Club statistics

References

1992 births
Living people
Canadian expatriate rugby union players
Canadian expatriate sportspeople in the United States
Expatriate rugby union players in the United States
Seattle Seawolves players
Sportspeople from Surrey, British Columbia
Rugby union fullbacks